Sudan People's Liberation Movement – North, or SPLM–N, is a political party and militant organisation in the Republic of Sudan, based in the states of Blue Nile and South Kordofan. , its two factions, SPLM-N (Agar) and SPLM-N (al-Hilu) were engaged in fighting each other and against the government of Sudan.

Creation
The SPLM-N was founded by the organizations of the predominantly South Sudanese Sudan People's Liberation Movement/Army that remained in Sudan following the South Sudanese vote for independence in 2011. Despite the Comprehensive Peace Agreement, a low-level conflict continued in Republic of Sudan. Conflict with the central authorities has led al-Bashir to ban the party. South Sudan is also said to support SPLA-N operations in Sudan, just as Sudan supports anti-government groups in South Sudan.

2011 Resumption of Conflict

South Kordofan 
On 19 July 2011, shortly after the independence of South Sudan/ Nuba Mountains the SPLM-N in South Kordofan and the Justice and Equality Movement of Darfur conducted a coordinated attack against the Sudanese army at Pisea, south of the state capital of Kadugli.  In August, Radio Dabanga reported that the rebels were gaining ground against government forces.  The conflict has led to the displacement of nearly 400,000 residents of the Nuba Mountains and surrounding areas.

Blue Nile 
Disputes over the rightful government of Blue Nile State led to a resumption of violence in late August/early September 2011. In September and October the SPLA-N formed a government based in Kurmuk, which took control of large parts of the state.  The conflict in the Blue Nile has raised fears of a new refugee crisis and a return to civil war.

In September 2012, Amnesty International reported that SPLM-N teacher and activist Jalila Khamis Koko was summoned by a prosecutor for six charges, primarily relating to state security. The organization stated that she appeared to be "held solely for her
humanitarian work and for the peaceful expression of her views", and designated her a prisoner of conscience. She was released after a court hearing on 20 January 2013.

2017 split
In mid-2017, the SPLM-N split between a faction led by Abdelaziz al-Hilu and one led by Malik Agar. Fighting between the two factions in the Blue Nile included the killing of an SPLM-N (Agar) army major by the SPLM-N (al-Hilu). SPLM-N (Agar) secretary-general Ismail Khamis Jallab claimed that SPLM-N (al-Hilu) had refused mediation efforts.

A key factor motivating the split was that al-Hilu's group insisted on including the establishment of a secular state in negotiations with the al-Bashir government of the time, while Agar's group disagreed. In the 2019–2020 Sudanese Revolution phase of the Sudanese peace process, the SPLM-N (al-Hilu) continued to insist on secularisation of the state as a requirement for a peace deal.

Sudanese peace process
The August 2019 Draft Constitutional Declaration, signed by military and civilian representatives during the 2018–19 Sudanese Revolution, requires that a peace agreement for resolving the War in Darfur and the Sudanese conflict in South Kordofan and Blue Nile be made within the first six months of the 39-month transition period to democratic civilian government. As part of the resulting Sudanese peace process, on 18 October, after a three-hour negotiating session mediated by a South Sudanese mediation team, Amar Daldoum, on behalf of the SPLM-N (al-Hilu) and Shams al-Din Khabbashi, on behalf of the Sovereignty Council signed an agreement on political, security and humanitarian procedures. The agreement was cosigned by the chair of the mediation team, Tut Galwak. The SPLM-N (al-Hilu) and the Sovereignty Council planned to develop a Declaration of Principles to organise continuation of the peace process and to present their political vision.

On 24 January political and security agreements, constituting a framework agreement, were signed by the Sovereignty Council and Ahmed El Omda Badi on behalf of SPLM-N (Agar). The agreements give legislative autonomy to South Kordofan and Blue Nile; propose solutions for the sharing of land and other resources; and aim to unify all militias and government soldiers into a single unified Sudanese military body. On 18 August 2020, the SPLM-N and the Sudanese government signed an agreement to integrate the rebels into the army within 39 months.

The SPLM-N (Agar) and SPLM-N (al-Hilu) factions signed a comprehensive peace agreement with the Transitional Government of Sudan on 31 August 2020 and 3 September 2020 respectively, and both factions will now participate in the transition to democracy in Sudan through peaceful means. Under the terms of the agreement, the factions that signed will be entitled to three seats on the sovereignty council, a total of five ministers in the transitional cabinet and a quarter of seats in the transitional legislature. At a regional level, signatories will be entitled between 30 and 40% of the seats on transitional legislatures of their home states or regions.

Aims and ideology
The party describes itself as "a Sudanese national movement that seeks to change the policies of the centre in Khartoum and to build a new centre for the benefit of all Sudanese people regardless of their religion, gender or ethnicity background".  Since the resumption of conflict, the party has called for negotiations and a ceasefire, however some leaders of the SPLA-N have warned of a potential second partition of the Sudan.

Leadership

SPLM-N (Agar)
, the SPLM-N (Agar) faction of the party is chaired by Malik Agar and Ismael Jallab is the secretary-general. , Yasir Arman is the deputy chair of SPLM-N (Agar).

SPLM-N (al-Hilu)
, Abdelaziz al-Hilu heads the SPLM-N (al-Hilu) faction.

See also 
 Comprehensive Peace Agreement
 Eastern Front (Sudan)
 Alliance of Revolutionary Forces of West Sudan

References

External links 
  
 Save Jalila - Website raising awareness of Jalila Khamis Koko

Rebel groups in Sudan
Political parties in Sudan
North
Banned political parties
Sudan Revolutionary Front